Josie may refer to:

People:
 Josie (name), various people and fictional characters with the given name
 Edith Josie (1921-2000), Canadian writer and newspaper columnist
 Peter Josie, Saint Lucia politician
 Josie (stylist), Spanish stylist and fashion journalist

In music:
 Josie Records, a record label
 "Josie" (Blink-182 song), a 1998 single
 "Josie" (Donovan song), a 1966 single
 "Josie" (Steely Dan song), a song on the 1977 album Aja and 1978 single
 "Josie", a song by the Glorious Sons from their 2017 album Young Beauties and Fools
Other uses:
 Josie Township, Holt County, Nebraska
 Josie, a 1991 TV series starring Josie Lawrence
 Josie (film), a 2018 thriller film starring Dylan McDermott

See also
 Josephine (disambiguation)
 Josey (disambiguation)

origin 
The female version of the name Joseph, with french origins.